People's Advocate may refer to:

Newspapers
 People's Advocate (British Columbia), a former newspaper
 The People's Advocate and New South Wales Vindicator, an Australian newspaper 1848–1856
 The People's Advocate, a Nigerian newspaper published by Abdulkareem Adisa
 The People's Advocate, First African-American newspaper in the State of Virginia, U.S, 1876–1891
 Uralla Times, formerly Uralla Times and People's Advocate, an Australian newspaper

Other uses
 Romanian Ombudsman (Romanian: Avocatul Poporului 'People's Advocate'), an independent institution
 Avokati i Popullit (Albanian, 'People's Advocate'), the Albanian office of the ombudsman
 Daniel Sheehan: The People's Advocate, a 2013 memoir published by Daniel Sheehan (attorney) 
 People's Advocate, Inc., founded by Paul Gann (1912–1989)

See also
 Voice of the people (disambiguation)